Canal Siete (call sign LU 81 TV) is an television station broadcasting from the city of Altos del Palihue for Bahía Blanca, Buenos Aires, Argentina as an Artear owned and operated station. Built and signed on in February 1966, the station competes with Telefe Bahía Blanca.

Local shows
Siete Mundo Magazine - newsmagazine
Toda la Gente - public affairs
A Puertas Abiertas - public affairs
Arquitectura Paisajista - cultural
Experiencia 4x4 - Offroad
Fútbol de Liga - Soccer
Plan de Obra - Buildings

External links

Television stations in Argentina
Television channels and stations established in 1966